Alexander Popham (c. 1605–1669) was an English MP for Bath, Wiltshire and Minehead.

Alexander Popham may also refer to:

 Alexander Popham, nephew of the previous; deaf mute taught by William Holder to speak "plainly and distinctly, and with a good and graceful tone".
Alexander Popham (died 1556) (1504–1556), MP for Bridgwater, 1545 and 1547
Alexander Popham (died 1602), MP for Bridgwater (UK Parliament constituency)
Alexander Popham (died 1705), MP for Chippenham and Bath
Alexander Popham (penal reformer) (1729–1810), British politician and penal reformer